Predicative may refer to:
 Something having the properties of a grammatical predicate
 Predicative expression, part of a clause that typically follows a copula (linking verb)
 Predicative verb, a verb that behaves as a grammatical adjective
 In mathematics and logic something without impredicativity, without a self-referencing definition
 Predicative programming, a methodology for program specification and refinement